Tolpis is a genus of flowering plants in the tribe Cichorieae within the family Asteraceae. It is native to Africa, Southern Europe, the Middle East and Macaronesia. Many species are limited to the Canary Islands.

 Species
 Tolpis × grossii Talavera
 Tolpis azorica (Nutt.) P.Silva - Azores 
 Tolpis barbata (L.) Gaertn. - Spain, Portugal, Morocco, Algeria, Tunisia
 Tolpis calderae Bolle - La Palma in Canary Islands
 Tolpis capensis (L.) Sch.Bip. - Africa (from Ethiopia to Cape Province), Madagascar
 Tolpis coronopifolia (Desf.) Biv. - La Palma + Gran Canaria + Tenerife in Canary Islands
 Tolpis crassiuscula Svent. - Tenerife in Canary Islands
 Tolpis crithmifolia DC.
 Tolpis farinulosa (Webb) Walp. - Cape Verde 
 Tolpis filiformis DC.
 Tolpis glabrescens Kämmer - Tenerife in Canary Islands
 Tolpis laciniata (Sch.Bip.) - Tenerife + Gomera + La Palma + Hierro in Canary Islands
 Tolpis lagopoda C.Sm. ex Link - Canary Islands
 Tolpis liouvillei Braun-Blanq. & Maire - Morocco
 Tolpis macrorhiza (Lowe) Lowe - Madeira 
 Tolpis mbalensis G.V.Pope - Malawi, Zambia
 Tolpis nemoralis Font Quer - Spain, Morocco
 Tolpis proustii Pit. - Gomera + Hierro in Canary Islands
 Tolpis staticifolia (All.) Sch.Bip. - south-central Europe from Germany to Albania
 Tolpis succulenta Lowe - Azores, Madeira
 Tolpis umbellata Bertol. - Mediterranean from Azores to Palestine
 Tolpis virgata (Desf.) Bertol. - Mediterranean + Middle East from Corsica to Yemen
 Tolpis webbii Sch.Bip. - Gomera + Tenerife in Canary Islands

References

External links
 Jepson Manual: Tolpis

Cichorieae
Flora of Europe
Flora of North Africa
Flora of Western Asia
Asteraceae genera
Taxa named by Michel Adanson